Big Rock is an unincorporated community and census-designated place (CDP)in Buchanan County, Virginia located at the convergence of County Route 650 and U.S. Route 460, a short distance from the Kentucky state line. It was first listed as a CDP in the 2020 census with a population of 199.

A post office was established at Big Rock in 1854. The boulder from which the community likely took its name was destroyed in the 1930s by the building of the railroad.

References

Census-designated places in Buchanan County, Virginia
Census-designated places in Virginia
Unincorporated communities in Buchanan County, Virginia
Unincorporated communities in Virginia
Coal towns in Virginia